Black Mother is a 2018 documentary film by American filmmaker Khalik Allah. It premiered at the 2018 True/False Film Festival in March, won a prize at The Montclair Film Festival, and was nominated for the Truer Than Fiction Award at the 35th Independent Spirit Awards.

Black Mother was released in theaters in the US on March 8, 2019 to critical acclaim.

Synopsis
Revisiting his ancestral homeland, director Khalik Allah takes his audience on a spiritual, visual, and tactile journey through Jamaica, discovering new depths and beauty in the island and those who continue to call it home.

Reception

Critical reception
On Rotten Tomatoes, the film holds an approval rating of  based on  reviews. The site's consensus reads: "A transfixing ode to geographic and familial roots, Black Mother pays poetic tribute to a place and culture from a brilliantly unique perspective." On Metacritic, the film has a weighted average score of 86 out of 100 based on 10 critics, indicating "universal acclaim".

Citing the film as his 9th favorite movie of 2019, K. Austin Collins of Vanity Fair wrote, "The film capitalizes on what Allah does best: an audio track mismatched from the visual landscape just so, so that words and images stand alone while also together, ricocheting and complicating each other. Allah films people at home, on the street, in the midst of giving birth; he compiles it all into an energetic meditation on maternity and identity that stirs the soul."

Awards and nominations

It won prizes at The Montclair Film Festival, The Indie Memphis Film Festival, and the Montréal Festival of New Cinema.

Film festivals
Black Mother was included in the lineups of film festivals including New Directors/New Films, AFI Fest, and International Film Festival Rotterdam.

References

External links 
 

2018 documentary films
2018 films